Kurt Eberhard (12 September 1874 – 8 September 1947) was a German Nazi officer. He rose to the rank of Brigadeführer of the SS and in the German army. During World War II, Eberhard was given the command over the occupied city of Kyiv in Ukraine. He was involved in planning and supervising the Babi Yar massacres during which over 33,771 people were murdered.

Eberhard was captured by U.S. authorities in November 1945, and detained in Stuttgart. He killed himself in custody on 8 September 1947.

References

1874 births
1947 suicides
People from Rottweil (district)
People from the Kingdom of Württemberg
SS-Brigadeführer
German Army personnel of World War I
Military personnel of Württemberg
Major generals of the Reichswehr
Nazis who committed suicide in prison custody
Recipients of the Silver Imtiyaz Medal
Commanders of the Order of Military Merit (Bulgaria)
Nazis who committed suicide in Germany
Major generals of the German Army (Wehrmacht)
Babi Yar
Holocaust perpetrators in Ukraine
Prisoners who died in United States military detention
German Army generals of World War II